Focus Entertainment (formerly Focus Home Interactive) is a French video game developer and publisher based in Paris, France. Founded in 1996, Focus has published and distributed original titles such as Sherlock Holmes, TrackMania, Runaway, and sports games like Cycling Manager and Virtual Skipper.

History 

On 25 June 2010, it was announced that Focus had acquired the Cities XL franchise from now defunct Monte Cristo. In 2012, Focus began working with Giants Software, creator of Farming Simulator. In April 2018, then-CEO Cédric Lagarrigue left the company after 20 years.

In June 2020, the company acquired Deck13 for €7.1 million. In April 2021, Focus also acquired Streum On Studio.

On September 6, 2021, Focus Home Interactive rebranded to Focus Entertainment.

In October 2021, Focus acquired Douze Dixiemes.

In February 2022, Focus acquired Leikir Studio, for an undisclosed sum.

On September 13, 2022, Focus acquired BlackMill Games.

Studios

Games

References

External links

 

 
1996 establishments in Paris
Companies based in Paris
Companies listed on Euronext Paris
French companies established in 1996
Video game companies established in 1996
Video game companies of France
Video game development companies
Video game publishers